The 1930 Constitution of the Ethiopian Empire vested executive legislature to Chamber of Senate and Chamber of Deputies in the imperial promulgation. These chambers had no members in the revisited 1956 Constitution—shall meet at the beginning and ending of each session, on some occasions upon the call of the emperor. The President of the Chamber shall preside all joint meetings.

Election of Chamber of Deputies run for normal expiry date of their term of office. The Senate consisted of 120 members (one-half of total Deputies whereas the Chamber of Deputies consisted of 250 members elected in four years.

Structure
The 1930 Constitution of Ethiopia defined that the emperor constitute the Chamber of Senate (Yeheggue Mewossegna Meker Beth) and Chamber of Deputies (Yeheggue Memeriya Meker Beth). This law was executed by the command of imperial promulgation. In accordance with the revisited 1956 Constitution Article 56, no one can be simultaneously member of Chamber of Deputies and the Senate. The two chambers shall meet at the beginning or end of each session. Under circumstances in Article 90 and 91, in some occasions upon the call of the emperor, the President of the Chamber shall preside at all joint meetings of the Chambers. Elections of members of Chambers of Deputies run in normal expiry date of their term of office.

Parliamentary structure
The Senate consisted of one half of total Deputies (125), all pointed by the Emperor for 6 years terms (one-third of whom are renewed every 2 years. The Chamber of Deputies composed 250 members elected in 4 years.

Electoral system
Every natural citizen, typically aged 21, could participate in an electoral district for candidate, from whom the Chamber of Deputies may vote. Depriving from civil rights or imprisoning for criminal charge was disqualified.

In order to elected for Deputies, a person must become naturally Ethiopian citizens aged 25, who genuinely registered to resident constituency. The person additionally required their personal property for qualifications by the electoral law, worthening 1,000 dollars and personal property of 2,000 dollars.  For districts that contained 200,000 inhabitants in the Ethiopian Empire, each Districts represented 2 Deputies, and for town with 30,000 inhabitants, one Deputies was delegated whereas for 50,000 inhabitants for excess of 30,000.

Prior to the 1973 general election, Emperor Haile Selassie, with ultimate power in legislature, had proposed a bill for taxation of land and certain tenant rights.

References

Ethiopian Empire
Government of the Ethiopian Empire
Government of Ethiopia